Khalil Rahme is a Lebanon international rugby league footballer who plays as a  for the Ipswich Jets in the Queensland Cup.

Background
Rahme is of Lebanese descent.

Playing career

Club career
Rahme came through the youth system at in Victoria, playing in the Jersey Flegg Cup side in 2020.

He moved to the Canberra Raiders in 2021.

Rahme moved to the Canterbury-Bankstown Bulldogs ahead of their 2022 season, featuring with the Mount Pritchard Mounties.

International career
Rahme made his international debut in September 2019 against Fiji in Sydney, scoring a try off the bench.

In 2022 he was named in the Lebanon squad for the 2021 Rugby League World Cup.

Rahme made his World Cup debut in October 2022 against New Zealand in Warrington.

References

External links
Lebanon profile

Living people
South Sydney Rabbitohs players
Rugby league locks
Lebanon national rugby league team players
Year of birth missing (living people)